Ambatry Mitsinjo is a rural municipality in southwest Madagascar. It belongs to the district of Betioky Atsimo (Betioky Sud), which is a part of Atsimo-Andrefana Region.

References

Populated places in Atsimo-Andrefana